Fricker is surname. Notable people with the surname include:

Brenda Fricker (born 1945), Academy Award-winning Irish actress
Edward Thomas Fricker (1858–1917), Australian newspaper editor
John Fricker, British actor, played Marteetee in Your Highness
Lizzie Fricker, fellow and tutor at Magdalen College, Oxford
Mark Fricker (born 1959), sub-four-minute miler of the 1980s
Miranda Fricker (born 1966), English philosopher
Olga Fricker (1902–1997), Canadian-born dancer, educator and choreographer
Oliver Fricker (born 1977/78), Swiss criminal
Pat Fricker (1916–1970), Australian rules footballer and former captain
Peter Racine Fricker (1920–1990), English composer who lived in the US for the last 30 years of his life
Sara Fricker (1772–1834), wife of English poet Samuel Taylor Coleridge
Sylvia Fricker Tyson, CM (born 1940), musician, performer, singer-songwriter and broadcaster
Werner Fricker (1936–2001), U.S. soccer halfback and president of the US Soccer Federation

See also
Fricker Glacier, north of Monnier Point flowing into Mill Inlet, on the east coast of Graham Land
Bricker, a surname
Fricke, a surname
Frickley (disambiguation)